Johannes Carolus Bernardus (Jan) Sluijters, or Sluyters (17 December 1881 in 's-Hertogenbosch – 8 May 1957 in Amsterdam) was a Dutch painter and co-founder of the Moderne Kunstkring.

Sluijters (in English often spelled "Sluyters") was a leading pioneer of various post-impressionist movements in the Netherlands. He experimented with several styles, including fauvism and cubism, finally settling on a colorful expressionism. His paintings feature nude studies, portraits, landscapes, and still lifes. His work was part of the painting event in the art competition at the 1928 Summer Olympics.

Legacy
A number of streets are named after him in the Netherlands, including one in the neighborhood of streets named after 19th and 20th century Dutch painters in Overtoomse Veld-Noord, Amsterdam.

Public collections

Among the public collections holding works by Jan Sluyters  are:
 Dordrechts Museum, Dordrecht, The Netherlands
 Drents Museum, Assen, The Netherlands
 Museum Boijmans Van Beuningen, Rotterdam, The Netherlands
 Noordbrabants Museum, Den Bosch, The Netherlands
 Nederlands Steendrukmuseum, Valkenswaard, The Netherlands
 Rijksmuseum Amsterdam, The Netherlands
 Singer Museum, Laren, The Netherlands
 Stedelijk Museum Alkmaar, Alkmaar, The Netherlands
 Van Abbemuseum, Eindhoven, The Netherlands
 Van Gogh Museum, Amsterdam, The Netherlands
 Museum de Fundatie, Zwolle, The Netherlands

References

Notes

Sources

External links
 Sluyters at Artcyclopedia
 

1881 births
1957 deaths
People from 's-Hertogenbosch
Prix de Rome (Netherlands) winners
20th-century Dutch painters
Dutch male painters
Olympic competitors in art competitions
20th-century Dutch male artists